Teixidor or Texidor is a Catalan occupational surname that means "weaver". Notable people with this surname include:

 Emili Teixidor (1932–2012), Spanish writer
 Enric Saborit Teixidor (b. 1992), Spanish footballer
 Jaime Teixidor (1884–1957), Spanish musician
 Joe Texidor (1941–2007), Puerto Rican jazz percussionist
 José María Doussinague y Teixidor (1894–1967), Spanish diplomat
 Josefa Texidor Torres (1865–1914), Spanish painter
 Montserrat Teixidor i Bigas, mathematician
 Pere d'Alberní i Teixidor (1747–1802), Spanish soldier

See also
 Teixidó
 Texidor's twinge

Catalan-language surnames